Fiona Balfour is an Australian business executive in the field of information technology. She has been named Chief Information Officer of the Year in Australia four times: 2003, 2004, 2005, and 2006. In 2006 she was awarded the Pearcey Award for distinguished lifetime achievement and contribution to the development and growth of Australian IT professions, research and industry. In 2017 she was appointed to the board of the Western Sydney Airport Corporation by Urban Infrastructure Minister Paul Fletcher. In May 2021 she was appointed to the board of the Australian Broadcasting Corporation by communications minister Paul Fletcher against the recommendations of an independent panel.

Life
Balfour was born in Melbourne, Australia, and completed a bachelor of arts degree in English and history at Monash University in 1979. She initially worked in the public sector, in the Victorian State Public Service followed by the Commonwealth Government, in roles related to project management and project leadership. From 1985 to 1991 she worked in management consulting and continued her studies with a Graduate Diploma in Information Management from the University of New South Wales and an MBA from RMIT University.

In 1992, Balfour joined Qantas and held a variety of positions before being appointed Chief Information Officer and a member of the Qantas Executive Committee in 2001. In 2003 her roles was expanded to include IT, procurement, property, financial services, and human resources services.

In 2006 she was appointed Chief Information Officer at Telstra, a position she held for ten months. Balfour went on to hold a number of non-executive director positions and to teach at the University of New South Wales Business School. Balfour joined ABC board in 2021.

References

Living people
Year of birth missing (living people)
Australian women business executives
Australian business executives
Monash University alumni
University of New South Wales alumni
Academic staff of the University of New South Wales
RMIT University alumni
Businesspeople from Melbourne
20th-century Australian women
21st-century Australian women
21st-century Australian people